Hetu or Hétu may refer to:

People
Damien Hétu (1926–2010), Canadian politician
Jacques Hétu (1938–2010), Canadian composer and music educator
Jean-Paul Hétu (1932–2012), Quebec trade unionist
Pierre Hétu (1936–1998), Canadian conductor and pianist
Hetu Bhardwaj (born 1937), Indian Hindi fiction writer
Jarvis Hetu, Canadian figure skater; see 2001 Canadian Figure Skating Championships

Other uses
Henkilötunnus, national identification number in Finland
Yellow River Map, a Chinese divination scheme
Hetu or "reason", element of an argument in Indian and Buddhist logic, as in Hetucakra

See also
Ye Dharma Hetu, a Sanskrit dhāraṇī (mantra)